Anton Igorevich Babikov (born 2 August 1991) is a Russian biathlete. He competes in the Biathlon World Cup, and represents Russia at the Biathlon World Championships 2016.

Biathlon results
All results are sourced from the International Biathlon Union.

Olympic Games

World Championships
1 medal (1 gold)

*The single mixed relay was added as an event in 2019.

World Cup

Individual victories
2 victories (1 Pu, 1 In)

*Results are from UIPMB and IBU races which include the Biathlon World Cup, Biathlon World Championships and the Winter Olympic Games.

References

External links

1991 births
Living people
Russian male biathletes
Sportspeople from Ufa
Biathlon World Championships medalists
Biathletes at the 2018 Winter Olympics
Olympic biathletes of Russia
20th-century Russian people
21st-century Russian people